Pleurotomella intermedia is an extinct species of sea snail, a marine gastropod mollusk in the family Raphitomidae.

Description

Distribution
Fossils of this marine species were found in Oise, France

References

 Gougerot, L. & Le Renard, J. (1982) Clefs de détermination des petites espèces de gastéropodes de l'Éocène du bassin parisien. XIX. Le genre Pleurotomella. Cahiers des Naturalistes, 37, 81–92 page(s): 84, 90, fig. 7

intermedia
Gastropods described in 1982